The Jico deer mouse (Habromys simulatus) is a species of rodent in the family Cricetidae found only in Mexico. Its natural habitat is subtropical or tropical moist lowland forests.

References

 

Habromys
Endemic mammals of Mexico
Rodents of North America
Endangered animals
Mammals described in 1904
Taxonomy articles created by Polbot
Veracruz moist forests